Thishiwe Ziqubu (born 5 August 1985) is a South African film director, writer and actor. She won Best Actress in a Supporting Role at the 2016 Africa Movie Academy Awards for his portrayal of Tshaka in the romantic comedy Tell Me Sweet Something. In 2019, he directed episodes of MTV Shuga Down South.

Ziqubu is a trans man and in a relationship with his partner Mandisa Nduna.

Education
Ziqubu studied scriptwriting and directing after high school. He later attended the African Film and Drama Academy (AFDA), a film school. He also completed an Acting for Film programme at the Los Angeles campus of the New York Film Academy.

Career

Ziqubu made his acting debut in the 2011 drama film Man on Ground, which helped to move his career forward. As a scriptwriter and director, he wrote and directed three independent short films: Out Of Luck, Subdued and Between the Lines. He has also written for South African television soap operas Isidingo and Rhythm City  and for Is'Thunzi, a drama series.  He co-created, wrote (as head writer) and directed a supernatural four-part drama series entitled Emoyeni.

In 2019, he directed episodes of the second season of TV series MTV Shuga Down South.

Partial filmography

References

External links

Living people
1985 births
21st-century South African actresses
Actresses from Johannesburg
Best Supporting Actress Africa Movie Academy Award winners
South African lesbian actresses
LGBT film directors
South African LGBT screenwriters
Lesbian screenwriters
New York Film Academy alumni
South African film actresses
South African film directors
Place of birth missing (living people)